Werchter is a small village in Belgium which has been part of the municipality of Rotselaar since 1 January 1977. It is the site of Rock Werchter and the birthplace of the painters Cornelius Van Leemputten and Frans Van Leemputten. The origin of the Werchter's name is unknown, but is thought to be related to water.

Rock Werchter

Rock Werchter is a music festival held annually during the first weekend of the summer holidays in Werchter. It was first organised in 1974 and since 2003 the festival lasts four days, and the 2003 and 2005 editions won the Arthur award for the best festival in the world of the International Live Music Conference. It's the largest music festival in Belgium and one of the largest festivals in Europe. It's even famous over the Belgian borders. Each year, many renowned groups and artists perform at Rock Werchter, and over 320,000 people come to the festival. Originally it was a double-festival, called "Rock Torhout-Werchter", with two festival areas on different places in Belgium: one in Werchter and one in Torhout. There is also a "Rock Werchterroute", a cycling route, around Werchter and Leuven, which also organises an annual music festival which is among the most popular in Belgium, Marktrock.

References 

Populated places in Flemish Brabant